Events in the year 1947 in Turkey.

Parliament
 8th Parliament of Turkey

Incumbents
President – İsmet İnönü 
Prime Minister
Recep Peker (up to 10 September)
Hasan Saka (from 10 September)
Leader of the opposition
Celal Bayar

Ruling party and the main opposition
 Ruling party – Republican People's Party (CHP)
 Main opposition – Democrat Party (DP)

Cabinet
 15th government of Turkey(up to 10 September)
16th government of Turkey (from 10 September)

Events
20 February – Trade Union was founded 
 7 April – By elections
12 March – US military aid to Turkey
12 July – Mutual Declaration of the ruling and the opposition parties about democracy
9 September – Recep Peker who was considered as a hard-line politician resigned from his post as prime minister
21 September – Mine incident in Kozlu, Zonguldak , 21 deaths
25 October – Soviet Union asked to annex Kars and Ardahan in the United Nations assembly
27 November – Statues of Halkevleri was changed

Births
1 January – Cemil Turan, footballer
5 January – Osman Arpacıoğlu, footballer
1 April – Beşir Atalay, government minister
16 April – Erol Evgin, singer
22 December – Tarık Ümit, intelligence official
21 May – İlber Ortaylı, academic, historian
14 July – Salih Neftçi, economist
4 August – Ertuğrul Özkök, journalist
5 August – Osman Durmuş, politician, MD
15 October – Hümeyra Akbay, singer
12 December – Hülya Koçyiğit, actress
27 December – Osman Pamukoğlu, military officer, politician

Deaths
2 February – Mehmet Naki Yücekök (born in 1866), retired military officer
6 March – İhsan Eryavuz, former government minister and businessman
27 July – Cemal Nadir Güler (born in 1902), caricaturist
3 December -Mehmet Atıf Ateşdağlı (born in 1876), retired military officer

Gallery

References

 
Years of the 20th century in Turkey
Turkey
Turkey
Turkey